Rafael Joaquín Trujillo Villar (born 14 December 1975 in La Línea de la Concepción, Cádiz) is a Spanish sailor of the Finn class and an Olympic medalist. He won the Finn Gold Cup once and competed in four straight Olympic Games, winning a silver medal in Athens 2004. 

He sailed with +39 Challenge in the 2007 Louis Vuitton Cup.

Trujillo was also part of the Mapfre yacht in the 2014–15 Volvo Ocean Race, and coaches 2013 world champion Jorge Zarif.

References

External links

1975 births
Living people
Spanish male sailors (sport)
Olympic sailors of Spain
Sportspeople from La Línea de la Concepción
Sailors at the 2000 Summer Olympics – Star
Sailors at the 2004 Summer Olympics – Finn
Sailors at the 2008 Summer Olympics – Finn
Sailors at the 2012 Summer Olympics – Finn
Olympic silver medalists for Spain
Olympic medalists in sailing
Medalists at the 2004 Summer Olympics
Volvo Ocean Race sailors
2007 America's Cup sailors
Finn class world champions
World champions in sailing for Spain